Negroland: A Memoir is a 2015 book by Margo Jefferson. It is a memoir of growing up in 1950s and 1960s America within a small, privileged segment of black American society known as the black bourgeoisie, or African-American upper class.

Awards and honors
2016 National Book Critics Circle Award (Autobiography), winner.
June 2016, chosen as a Book of the Week by BBC Radio 4.
 2016 Chicago Tribune Heartland Prize.

See also
E. Franklin Frazier's sociological Black Bourgeoisie (first edition in English in 1957 translated from the 1955 French original) 
Lawrence Otis Graham's Our Kind of People: Inside America’s Black Upper Class (2000)

References

2015 non-fiction books
English-language books
American memoirs
African-American literature
Literature by African-American women
African-American autobiographies
National Book Critics Circle Award-winning works
Pantheon Books books